Lustige Blätter (German: Comic Pages) was a satirical magazine published between 1885 and 1944 in Berlin. Its subtitle was schönstes buntes Witzblatt Deutschlands (German: Germany's most beautiful colorful humor paper).

History and profile
Lustige Blätter was established by the writer Alexander Moszkowski in Berlin in 1885. From 1887 to 1891 it was a supplement to Berliner Börsen-Courier. Moszkowski and Paul von Schönthan were the founding editors-in-chief of the magazine. The former held the post until his retirement in 1927. The magazine was published on a weekly basis and featured satirical articles and cartoons about social and cultural events. Heinrich Zille, Lyonel Feininger,  Walter Trier and Julius Klinger were among its leading caricaturists and illustrators. Other major contributors of the magazine were Bruno Balz, Betty Korytowska, Max Brinkmann, Rudolf Presber, Gustav Hochstetter, and Georg Mühlen-Schulte. 

The magazine held a liberal political stance. However, during the Nazi period it contained anti-semitic material. Lustige Blätter folded in 1944.

References

External links

1885 establishments in Germany
1944 disestablishments in Germany
Antisemitic publications
Defunct magazines published in Germany
German-language magazines
German political satire
Magazines established in 1885
Magazines disestablished in 1944
Magazines published in Berlin
Satirical magazines published in Germany
Weekly magazines published in Germany
Newspaper supplements